Congregation Shaarey Zedek is the oldest Orthodox Jewish congregation in Windsor, Ontario, Canada. Founded in 1893, the congregants initially met in private homes. In 1906, a dedicated synagogue was built at the corner of Brant and Mercer streets. It served the community for over 50 years. The congregation moved to its current location at 610 Giles Boulevard East in 1958.

As of 2011, Congregation Shaarey Zedek has a membership of approximately 40 families. The rabbi is Sholom Galperin.

References

External links
 Congregation Shaarey Zedek of Windsor website

Buildings and structures in Windsor, Ontario
Culture of Windsor, Ontario
Synagogues in Ontario
Orthodox synagogues in Canada
Residential buildings completed in 1893
1893 establishments in Ontario
19th-century religious buildings and structures in Canada